The ocean temperature varies by depth, geographical location and season. Both the temperature and salinity of ocean water differs. Warm surface water is generally saltier than the cooler deep or polar waters; in polar regions, the upper layers of ocean water are cold and fresh. Deep ocean water is cold, salty water found deep below the surface of Earth's oceans. This water has a very uniform temperature, around 0-3°C. The ocean temperature also depends on the amount of solar radiation falling on its surface. There is a continuous circulation of water in the oceans. Thermohaline circulation (THC) is a part of the large-scale ocean circulation that is driven by global density gradients created by surface heat and freshwater fluxes. Warm surface currents cool as they move away from the tropics, and the water becomes denser and sinks. The cold water moves back towards the equator as a deep sea current, driven by changes in the temperature and density of the water, before eventually welling up again towards the surface. 

Ocean temperature as a term is used either for the temperature in the ocean at any depth, or specifically for the ocean temperatures that are not near the surface (in which case it is synonymous with "deep ocean temperature").

It is clear that the oceans are warming as a result of climate change and this rate of warming is increasing. The upper ocean (above 700 m) is warming fastest, but the warming trend extends throughout the ocean. In 2022, the global ocean was the hottest ever recorded by humans.

Definition and types

Sea surface temperature

Deep ocean temperature
The temperature further below the surface is called "ocean temperature" or "deep ocean temperature". Ocean temperatures (more than 20 metres below the surface) also vary by region and time, and they contribute to variations in ocean heat content and ocean stratification. The increase of both ocean surface temperature and deeper ocean temperature is an important effect of climate change on oceans.

Deep ocean water is the name for cold, salty water found deep below the surface of Earth's oceans. Deep ocean water makes up about 90% of the volume of the oceans. Deep ocean water has a very uniform temperature, around 0-3°C, and a salinity of about 3.5% or 35 ppt (parts per thousand).

Relevance 
Ocean temperature and dissolved oxygen concentrations are two key parameters that influence the ocean's primary productivity, the oceanic carbon cycle, nutrient cycles, and marine ecosystems. They work in conjunction with salinity and density to control a range of processes such as mixing versus stratification, ocean currents and the thermohaline circulation.

Measurements 

Ocean temperature is measured by a variety of techniques. Below the sea surface, general temperature measurements are accompanied by a reference to the specific depth of measurement, because of significant variation with depths, especially during the daytime when low wind speed and a lot of sunshine may lead to the formation of a warm layer at the ocean surface and strong vertical temperature gradients (a diurnal thermocline).

The basic technique involves lowering a device termed CTD (the abbreviation stands for conductivity, temperature, and depth) which measures temperature and other parameters electronically. It continuously sends the data up to the ship via a conducting cable. This device is usually mounted on a frame which includes water sampling bottles. Since the 2010s autonomous vehicles–gliders, mini-submersibles etc.–are increasingly available. They carry the same CTD sensors, but operate independently of a research ship.    

The basic CTD system is used from both research ships (with the conducting cable) and on moorings gliders and even seals (for example Antarctic fur seals), although in all these latter cases the data has to be sent back by telemetry rather than conducting cables.   

Sea surface temperature measurements are confined to the near-surface layer. They can be measured with thermometers or spectroscopically from satellites. Weather satellites have been available to determine this parameter since 1967, with the first global composites created during 1970.

The Advanced Very High Resolution Radiometer (AVHRR) is "the most commonly used instrument to measure sea surface temperature from space".

Mercury thermometers 
The measurement technique used on ships and buoys is usually with thermistors and mercury thermometers. Mercury thermometers are widely to measure the temperature of surface waters; in this case they can be placed in buckets dropped over the side of a ship. To measure deeper temperatures they are placed on Nansen bottles.

Argo program

Ocean warming

Trends

Causes 
The root cause of these observed changes is the Earth warming due to anthropogenic emissions of greenhouse gases, such as for example carbon dioxide and methane. This leads inevitably to ocean warming, because the ocean is taking up most of the additional heat in the climate system.

In other words: the climb in ocean temperatures is the inevitable outcome of Earth's energy imbalance, primarily associated with increasing concentrations of greenhouse gases.

Main physical effects

Increased stratification and lower oxygen levels 
Warming of the ocean surface due to higher air temperatures leads to increased ocean temperature stratification: The decline in mixing of the ocean layers stabilises warm water near the surface while reducing cold, deep water circulation. The reduced up and down mixing reduces the ability of the ocean to absorb heat, directing a larger fraction of future warming toward the atmosphere and land. Energy available for tropical cyclones and other storms is expected to increase, nutrients for fish in the upper ocean layers are set to decrease, as is the capacity of the oceans to store carbon.

Warmer water cannot contain as much oxygen as cold water. As a result, the gas exchange equilibrium changes to reduce ocean oxygen levels and increase oxygen in the atmosphere. Increased thermal stratification may lead to reduced supply of oxygen from the surface waters to deeper waters, and therefore further decrease the water's oxygen content. The ocean has already lost oxygen throughout the water column, and oxygen minimum zones are expanding worldwide.

Changing ocean currents 

Ocean currents are caused by varying temperatures associated with sunlight and air temperatures at different latitudes, as well as by prevailing winds and the different densities of saline and fresh water. Air tends to be warmed and thus rise near the equator, then cool and thus sink slightly further poleward. Near the poles, cool air sinks, but is warmed and rises as it then travels along the surface equatorward. Driven by this sinking and the upwelling that occurs in lower latitudes, as well as the driving force of the winds on surface water, the ocean currents act to circulate water throughout the entire sea. When global warming is added into the equation, changes occur, especially in the regions where deep water is formed.

In the geologic past 

Temperature reconstructions based on oxygen and silicon isotopes from rock samples have predicted much hotter Precambrian sea temperatures. Reconstructed proteins from Precambrian organisms have also provided evidence that the ancient world was much warmer than today.

The Cambrian Explosion (approximately 538.8 million years ago) was a key event in the evolution of life on Earth. This event took place at a time when sea surface temperatures have been proposed to reach about 60 °C. Such high temperatures are clearly above the upper thermal limit of 38 °C for modern marine invertebrates and preclude a major biological revolution.

This is likely to be the result of a favorable configuration of the continents during this period that allowed for improved circulation in the oceans and discouraged the formation of large scale ice sheet.

Data from an oxygen isotope database indicates that seven global warming events happened during a number of geologic time periods, for example during the Late Cambrian, Early Triassic,  Late Cretaceous, and Paleocene-Eocene transition. During these warming periods, the sea surface temperatures were about 5–30 °C higher than today.

See also
 Ocean current § Causes, temperature as a contributing cause of ocean currents
 Global surface temperature, a planet-wide average of temperatures at both the sea surface and the air over land
 Ocean heat content § Recent observations and changes, temperature as involved in vertical heat distribution and transport
 Marine heatwave
 Upwelling

References

 
Oceans
Coastal and oceanic landforms